Susanne is a feminine given name. It is a German and Scandinavian form of Susanna, with Susann and Suzanne as variants.

Notable persons with the given name Susanne include:

 Susanne Antonetta (born 1956), American poet and author
 Susanne Bier (born 1960), Danish film producer, director and writer
 Susanne Blakeslee (born 1956), American voice actress
 Susanne Ditlevsen, Danish mathematician and statistician
Susanne Eilersen (born 1964), Danish politician
 Marie-Suzanne Giroust (1734–1772), French painter
 Susanne Glesnes (born 1974), Norwegian beach volleyball player
 Susanne Hierl (born 1973), German politician
 Susanne Klatten (born 1962), German heiress
 Susanne Langer (1895–1985), American philosopher
 Susanne Lyons (born 1957), chair of the United States Olympic & Paralympic Committee (USOPC) 
 Susanne Manning (born 1982), British singer and radio personality
 Susanne Osthoff (born  1962), German archaeologist
 Susanne Riesch (born 1987), German alpine skier
 Susan Ann Sulley (born 1963), formerly known as Susanne Sulley, British singer
 Susanne Sundfør (born 1986), Norwegian singer/songwriter
 Susanne Sunesen (born 1977), Danish para-equestrian
 Susanne Uhlen (born 1955), German actress 
 Susanne Zenor (born 1947), American actress

See also
 Susan
 Susann
 Susi (disambiguation)
 Susie (disambiguation)
 Susy
 Suzanne (given name)
 Susanna (given name)
 Susannah (given name)
 Suzana

References

External links
 Behind the Name: Meaning, Origin and History of the Name Susanne 

Feminine given names
German feminine given names
English feminine given names
Given names derived from plants or flowers
Swedish feminine given names
Danish feminine given names
Scandinavian feminine given names
Icelandic feminine given names
Finnish feminine given names
Norwegian feminine given names
Swiss feminine given names